Acontia ruffinellii is a moth of the family Noctuidae. It is found in the Rio Grande do Sul region of Brazil and Uruguay.

ruffinellii
Moths of South America
Moths described in 1959